Walworth is an unincorporated community in Custer County, Nebraska, United States.

History
Walworth was founded in 1892. It was named for a Nebraska lumber baron.

References

Populated places in Custer County, Nebraska
Unincorporated communities in Nebraska